Some Hearts... is the Everly Brothers' final studio album. It was released November 4, 1988, but re-released in 1989. The album did not chart.

"Don't Worry Baby", a cover of the Beach Boys hit, charted in Australia.  It was later featured on the soundtrack to the 1995 film, Bye Bye Love (which itself takes its title from the Everly Brothers song of the same name).

Track listing
"Some Hearts" (Don Everly) – 5:22
"Don't Worry Baby" (Roger Christian, Brian Wilson) – 3:37
"Ride the Wind" (John Durrill, Phil Everly) – 3:29
"Be My Love Again" (Don Everly) – 4:36
"Can't Get over It" (Don Everly) – 4:25
"Angel of the Darkness" (John Durrill, Phil Everly) – 3:48
"Brown Eyes" (John Durrill, Phil Everly) – 2:41
"Three Bands of Steel" (Don Everly) – 2:45
"Julianne" (Patrick Alger, J. Fred Knobloch) – 3:05
"Any Single Solitary Heart" (John Hiatt, Mike Porter) – 4:12

Personnel
Don Everly – vocals, rhythm guitar, acoustic guitar
Phil Everly – vocals, guitar
Albert Lee – lead guitar
Phil Cranham – bass
Larrie Londin – drums
Pete Wingfield – keyboards
Hank DeVito – guitar, steel guitar
Greg Harris – guitar on "Angel of Darkness"
John Hobbs – keyboards on "Angel of Darkness" and "Brown Eyes"

Production notes
Allen Abrahamson – engineer
Barry Barnes – art direction
Dave Barton – engineer
Jeff Giedt – engineer, mixing
John Hobbs – vocal engineer
Guy Roche – vocal engineer
Ted Stein – engineer

References

1988 albums
The Everly Brothers albums
Mercury Records albums